Laughlin Force Base CDP is a census-designated place (CDP) covering the permanent residential population of the Laughlin Air Force Base in Val Verde County, Texas, United States. Per the 2020 census, the population was 1,673.

Demographics

2020 census

Note: the US Census treats Hispanic/Latino as an ethnic category. This table excludes Latinos from the racial categories and assigns them to a separate category. Hispanics/Latinos can be of any race.

2010 Census
As of the census of 2010, there were 1,569 people, 651 households, and 570 families residing on the base.  The population density was 377.6 people per square mile (145.9/km2).  There were 664 housing units at an average density of 112.7/sq mi (43.5/km2).  The racial makeup of the base was 78.4% White, 15.7% African American, 0.3% Native American, 2.7% Asian, 0.1% Pacific Islander, 4.5% from other races, and 3.4% from two or more races. Hispanic or Latino of any race were 12.3% of the population.

There were 651 households, out of which 56.1% had children under the age of 18 living with them, 82.8% were married couples living together, 3.4% had a female householder with no husband present, and 12.3% were non-families. 6.6% of all households were made up of individuals, and none had someone living alone who was 65 years of age or older.  The average household size was 3.00 and the average family size was 3.18.

On the base the population was spread out, with 30.6% under the age of 18, 23.6% from 18 to 24, 42.7% from 25 to 44, 2.5% from 45 to 64, and 0.6% who were 65 years of age or older.  The median age was 24 years. For every 100 females, there were 130.1 males.  For every 100 females age 18 and over, there were 136.4 males.

The median income for a household on the base was $38,625, and the median income for a family was $38,625. Males had a median income of $26,938 versus $19,643 for females. The per capita income for the base was $15,121.  About 3.1% of families and 4.6% of the population were below the poverty line, including 5.8% of those under age 18 and none of those age 65 or over.

Education
It is in the San Felipe-Del Rio Consolidated Independent School District.

The whole county is served by Southwest Texas Junior College according to the Texas Education Code.

References

Census-designated places in Val Verde County, Texas